The Fighting Renegade is a 1939 American western directed by Sam Newfield and produced by Sam Katzman for Katzman's Victory Pictures.

Plot
Framed for the murder of an archaeologist, Bill Carson (Tim McCoy) assumes the identity of "El Puma," 'a gun-slinging Mexican vigilante", which allows him to clear as well as speak with a "Mexican" accent for much of the movie.

Cast
Tim McCoy as Bill Carson
Joyce Bryant as Marian Willis
Ben Corbett as Magpie
Ted Adams as Link Benson
Budd Buster as Old Dobie
Dave O'Brien as Dr. Jerry Leonard
Forrest Taylor as Prof. Lucius Lloyd
Reed Howes as Sheriff
John Elliott as Prospector

External links

1939 films
American black-and-white films
1939 Western (genre) films
Films directed by Sam Newfield
American Western (genre) films
1930s English-language films
1930s American films